Arab Cubans refers to Arab immigrants and their descendants in Cuba and the Cuban diaspora. Most of Cuba's Arab community come from Syrian, Lebanese, or Palestinian background.

History 
While Arabic culture first came to Cuba through Spanish colonization, namely in the architecture and language, the Arab communities migrated to the island in the late nineteenth to early twentieth century. Many of the immigrants were economically motivated, but other elements including civil unrest and famine resulted in the emigration from their home countries. Most Arabs settled in Havana, with a significant number in Holguín and Santiago de Cuba, where they began establishing their businesses and institutions.

The neighborhood today known as Los Sitios, near Centro Habana and Habana Vieja, was home to nearly 25% of Cuba's Arab community during the migration periods of the early twentieth century. The Church of San Judas y San Nicolás near Calle Monte was a base for the Arab Maronite Catholic community in Havana during the early 20th century and is in continued operation until today.

Estimating the religious composition of Arab Cubans is difficult because of a lack of records. However, the Embassy of Lebanon last conducted a census on Lebanese descendants in Cuba in 1951. Most of the Lebanese-Arabs practiced the Maronite Catholic faith, while many adhered to other faiths including Orthodox Christian, Sunni Muslim, and Shia Muslim.

Arabic and Arab-centered newspapers existed in Cuba up until the 1970s, such as El Cercano Oriente (The Near East), El Árbol del Líbano (The Tree of Lebanon), Al-Etehad (The Union), Al-Faihaa (The Spacious), Al-Sayf (The Saber), and La Unión (The Union).

Arab Union of Cuba 
Arab organizations and associations began appearing during their immigration and existed in nearly every urban area in Cuba. Founded in 1979, The Arab Union of Cuba is the most notable and established Arab association in Cuba and it still operates today. Among the Arab Union of Cuba's work is the development of the Memorial to Arab Immigrants in the Park of the Arab Immigrant on Calle Monte in Havana's Los Sitios neighborhood.

Figures

Notable Arab Cubans 

 Yamil Chade, sports manager
Cucu Diamantes, singer, songwriter, actress, and philanthropist
 Emilio Estefan, musician and producer
 Emily Estefan, music artist
 Lili Estefan, model and host of El Gordo y la Flaca on Univision.
 Jamillette Gaxiola, model and Miss Cuba 2009
 Taufic Guarch, footballer
 Fayad Jamís, poet, painter, designer, journalist and translator

References 

Arab diaspora in the Caribbean
Demographics of the Caribbean
Cuban people of Arab descent